Dr. Um is an album by Peter Erskine. It earned Erskine a Grammy Award nomination for Best Jazz Instrumental Album.

References

2016 albums
Instrumental albums
Jazz albums by American artists
Peter Erskine albums